S. Gunasekaran is an Indian politician and a member of the 15th Tamil Nadu Legislative Assembly from the Tiruppur South constituency. He represents the All India Anna Dravida Munnetra Kazhagam party.

See also 
2016 Tamil Nadu Legislative Assembly election

References 

Tamil Nadu MLAs 2016–2021
All India Anna Dravida Munnetra Kazhagam politicians
Living people
Year of birth missing (living people)
Tamil Nadu politicians